"Ur Waist" is a song by Nigerian singer Iyanya. It was officially released as the second single from his second studio album, Desire (2013).  The song features vocals from Emma Nyra.

Music video
The accompanying music video for "Ur Waist" was directed by Clarence Peters. It was shot at Suntan Beach in Badagry.  A behind-the-scenes video was uploaded onto YouTube on 23 August 2012. Iyanya mentioned Yvonne Nelson, Tonto Dikeh, and Tiwa Savage in the song. A controversy arose during his freestyle on Tim Westwood's Crib Sessions. Iyanya initially said, "Yvonne Nelson, I have Your medicine", but replaced it with "Yvonne Nelson, I lost your medicine" during the freestyle.

Accolades
"Ur Waist" was nominated for Best Pop Single and Song of the Year at The Headies 2013, held in Lagos on 26 December 2013. "Ur Waist" earned Iyanya a nomination for Best International Performance at the 2013 Soul Train Music Awards.

Track listing
 Digital single

References

Iyanya songs
2012 songs
2012 singles
Song recordings produced by D'Tunes